The 16023 / 24   Malgudi Express is an Express train belonging to Indian Railways – Southern Railway zone that runs between  and  in India.

Coaches

The 16023 / 24   Malgudi Express has 16 Unreserved & 2 SLR Coaches.

Service

As the average speed of the train is below , as per Indian Railways rules, its fare doesn't includes a superfast surcharge.

Routing

Traction
Both trains are hauled by a WAP 7 of Royapuram electric loco shed on its entire journey.

References

External links
16023 Malgudi Express at India Rail Info
16024 Malgudi Express at India Rail Info

Named passenger trains of India
Rail transport in Karnataka
Transport in Mysore
Transport in Bangalore
Express trains in India